Transcription factor COE1 is a protein that in humans is encoded by the EBF1 gene. 
EBF1 stands for Early B-Cell Factor 1.

EBF1 controls the expression of key proteins required for B cell differentiation, signal transduction and function. The crucial role of this factor is shown in the regulation of expression of SLAM family co-receptors in B-cells.

Interactions 

EBF1 has been shown to interact with ZNF423 and CREB binding protein.

References

Further reading

External links